Charles Brenner may refer to:
 Charles Brenner (biochemist) (born 1961), American biochemist
 Charles Brenner (mathematician) (born 1945), American mathematician 
 Charles Brenner (psychiatrist) (1913–2008), American psychoanalyst